Corrado Invernizzi (born 25 April 1965) is an Italian actor.

Biography 
In movies, he appeared in Vincere (directed by Marco Bellocchio) as a psychiatrist, in Ford v. Ferrari, directed by James Mangold as Franco Gozzi (Enzo Ferrari's right hand), and in Piazza Fontana: The Italian Conspiracy directed by Marco Tullio Giordana as judge Pietro Calogero.

In theater, he appeared in The Coast of Utopia by Tom Stoppard also directed by Marco Tullio Giordana, in the role of literary critic Belinskij. The play received the Ubu Prize, the Le Maschere Awards and the Critic's Award in 2012.

In 2010, he worked with the Beijing Opera under Patrick Sommier in the play Water Margin by Shi Nai'an.

In the new television series Marco Polo, released on 12 December 2014 and produced by Netflix and The Weinstein Company, he plays Maffeo Polo, brother of Niccolò and Marco's uncle.

In 2016, he was part of the cast of Genius, the first US television series produced by National Geographic. The series was created by Ron Howard and is based on the life of Albert Einstein. He played the role of French physicist Pierre Curie.

The same year he also was a protagonist of an episode of the British series Doctor Who, titled Extremis, released on 20 May 2017 on BBC One.

In 2018 he co-starred in The Name of the Rose, the drama series based on the international bestseller novel of the same name by Umberto Eco, where he plays the role of Michele of Cesena.

In June 2018, he was cast in Ford v. Ferrari, where he was directed by James Mangold, playing Enzo Ferrari's right hand Franco Gozzi.

He is a tenor and studied opera singing at Conservatorio Giacomo Puccini in La Spezia.

Filmography
Source:

Cinema 
 Shooting the Moon (L'albero delle pere), directed by Francesca Archibugi (1998)
 Guido che sfidò le Brigate Rosse, directed by Giuseppe Ferrara (2005)
 The rest of the night (Il resto della notte), directed by Francesco Munzi (2007)
 Vincere, directed by Marco Bellocchio (2008)
 Requiem for a Killer (Requiem pour une tueuse), directed by Jérôme Le Gris (2010)
 Zabana!, directed by Said Ould Khelifa (2011)
 Piazza Fontana: The Italian Conspiracy (Romanzo di una strage), directed by Marco Tullio Giordana (2011)
 The Silent Mountain, directed by Ernst Gossner (2012)
 The Face of an Angel, directed by Michael Winterbottom (2013)
 Né Giulietta né Romeo, directed by Veronica Pivetti (2014)
 Viva la Sposa, directed by Ascanio Celestini (2015)
 Le Rire de ma mère, directed by Colombe Savignac and Pascal Ralite (2016)
 Ford v. Ferrari, directed by James Mangold (2019)
 The Bears' Famous Invasion of Sicily, directed by Lorenzo Mattotti (2019)
 Io sono Mia, directed by Riccardo Donna (2019)

Short films 
 Per una rosa directed by Marco Bellocchio (2011)
 Pagliacci, directed by Marco Bellocchio (2013)

Television 
 Inspector Montalbano (Il Commissario Montalbano), directed by Alberto Sironi (1999)
 Miroir d'Alice, directed by Marc Rivière (2001)
 Grand Star, directed by Paolo Barzman (2006)
 Les Fauves, directed by José Pinheiro (2008)
 The Young Montalbano (Il giovane Montalbano), directed by Gianluca Maria Tavarelli (2011)
 Braquo, directed by Frédéric Jardin (2013)
 Marco Polo, directed by Espen Sandberg, Joachim Roenning, Alik Sakharov, Daniel Minahan (2014)
 Genius by Kevin Hooks (2016)
 Doctor Who, episode Extremis, directed by Daniel Nettheim (2016)
 The Name of the Rose, directed by Giacomo Battiato (2019)

Theatre 
 Six Characters in Search of an Author by Luigi Pirandello, directed by Giuseppe Patroni Griffi (1999)
 The Misanthrope by Molière, directed by Gabriele Lavia (2000)
 The Lost Years by Vitaliano Brancati, directed by Francis Aiqui (2000) 
 Bar by Spiro Scimone, directed by Laurent Vacher (2004)
 Water Margin by Shi Nai'an, directed by Patrick Sommier (2010)
 The Coast of Utopia by Tom Stoppard, directed by Marco Tullio Giordana (2012)
 Bien Lotis by Philippe Malone, directed by Laurent Vacher (2013)

References

External links 

1965 births
Living people
Actors from Genoa
Italian comedians
Italian male film actors
Italian male stage actors
Italian male television actors
Italian tenors